Albion "Bert" Hendrickson (18 December 1897 – 28 April 1977) was an Australian politician.

He was educated at state schools in Maryborough, Victoria, before serving in the military from 1915 to 1918 in the 22nd Infantry Battalion before transferring to the 2nd Pioneer Battalion. He returned to become a public servant, and was an official with the Australian Postal Workers' Union. He was also employed as private secretary to Victorian Labor Senator Richard Keane. In 1946, he was elected to the Australian Senate as a Labor Senator for Victoria, taking his seat in 1947. He held the seat until his retirement in 1970, taking effect in 1971. From 1968 to 1971 he was a joint Father of the Senate.

Hendrickson died in 1977 (aged 79).

References

1897 births
1977 deaths
Australian Labor Party members of the Parliament of Australia
Members of the Australian Senate for Victoria
Members of the Australian Senate
20th-century Australian politicians